Green Island is an unincorporated settlement in Jackson County, Iowa, United States.

History
 Founded in the 1800s, Green Island's population was 125 in 1902, and 132 in 1925.

Green Island was an incorporated community until 1993.

References 

Unincorporated communities in Jackson County, Iowa
Unincorporated communities in Iowa